Metaprogramming is a programming technique in which computer programs have the ability to treat other programs as their data. It means that a program can be designed to read, generate, analyze or transform other programs, and even modify itself while running. In some cases, this allows programmers to minimize the number of lines of code to express a solution, in turn reducing development time. It also allows programs a greater flexibility to efficiently handle new situations without recompilation.

Metaprogramming can be used to move computations from run-time to compile-time, to generate code using compile time computations, and to enable self-modifying code. The ability of a programming language to be its own metalanguage is called reflection. Reflection is a valuable language feature to facilitate metaprogramming.

Metaprogramming was popular in the 1970s and 1980s using list processing languages such as LISP. LISP hardware machines were popular in the 1980s and enabled applications that could process  code. They were frequently used for artificial intelligence applications.

Approaches 
Metaprogramming enables developers to write programs and develop code that falls under the generic programming paradigm. Having the programming language itself as a first-class data type (as in Lisp, Prolog, SNOBOL, or Rebol) is also very useful; this is known as homoiconicity. Generic programming invokes a metaprogramming facility within a language by allowing one to write code without the concern of specifying data types since they can be supplied as parameters when used.

Metaprogramming usually works in one of three ways.
 The first approach is to expose the internals of the run-time engine to the programming code through application programming interfaces (APIs) like that for the .NET IL emitter. 
 The second approach is dynamic execution of expressions that contain programming commands, often composed from strings, but can also be from other methods using arguments or context, like JavaScript. Thus, "programs can write programs." Although both approaches can be used in the same language, most languages tend to lean toward one or the other.
 The third approach is to step outside the language entirely. General purpose program transformation systems such as compilers, which accept language descriptions and carry out arbitrary transformations on those languages, are direct implementations of general metaprogramming. This allows metaprogramming to be applied to virtually any target language without regard to whether that target language has any metaprogramming abilities of its own. One can see this at work with Scheme and how it allows tackling some limitations faced in C by using constructs that were part of the Scheme language itself to extend C.

Lisp is probably the quintessential language with metaprogramming facilities, both because of its historical precedence and because of the simplicity and power of its metaprogramming. In Lisp metaprogramming, the unquote operator (typically a comma) introduces code that is evaluated at program definition time rather than at run time; see Self-evaluating forms and quoting in Lisp. The metaprogramming language is thus identical to the host programming language, and existing Lisp routines can be directly reused for metaprogramming, if desired. This approach has been implemented in other languages by incorporating an interpreter in the program, which works directly with the program's data. There are implementations of this kind for some common high-level languages, such as RemObjects’ Pascal Script for Object Pascal.

Usages

Code generation 
A simple example of a metaprogram is this POSIX Shell script, which is an example of generative programming:

#!/bin/sh
# metaprogram
echo '#!/bin/sh' > program
for i in $(seq 992)
do
    echo "echo $i" >> program
done
chmod +x program

This script (or program) generates a new 993-line program that prints out the numbers 1–992. This is only an illustration of how to use code to write more code; it is not the most efficient way to print out a list of numbers. Nonetheless, a programmer can write and execute this metaprogram in less than a minute, and will have generated over 1000 lines of code in that amount of time.

A quine is a special kind of metaprogram that produces its own source code as its output. Quines are generally of recreational or theoretical interest only.

Not all metaprogramming involves generative programming. If programs are modifiable at runtime or if incremental compilation is available (such as in C#, Forth, Frink, Groovy, JavaScript, Lisp, Elixir, Lua, Nim, Perl, PHP, Python, REBOL, Ruby, Rust, SAS, Smalltalk, and Tcl), then techniques can be used to perform metaprogramming without actually generating source code.

One style of generative approach is to employ domain-specific languages (DSLs). A fairly common example of using DSLs involves generative metaprogramming: lex and yacc, two tools used to generate lexical analyzers and parsers, let the user describe the language using regular expressions and context-free grammars, and embed the complex algorithms required to efficiently parse the language.

Code instrumentation 

One usage of metaprogramming is to instrument programs in order to do dynamic program analysis.

Challenges 
Some argue that there is a sharp learning curve to make complete use of metaprogramming features. Since metaprogramming gives more flexibility and configurability at runtime, misuse or incorrect use of the metaprogramming can result in unwarranted and unexpected errors that can be extremely difficult to debug to an average developer. It can introduce risks in the system and make it more vulnerable if not used with care. Some of the common problems which can occur due to wrong use of metaprogramming are inability of the compiler to identify missing configuration parameters, invalid or incorrect data can result in unknown exception or different results. Due to this, some believe that only high-skilled developers should work on developing features which exercise metaprogramming in a language or platform and average developers must learn how to use these features as part of convention.

Uses in programming languages

Macro systems 

 Common Lisp and most Lisp dialects. 
 Scheme hygienic macros
 MacroML
 Racket (programming language) 
 Template Haskell
 Scala macros
 Clojure macros
 Nim
 Rust
 Haxe
Julia
 Elixir

Macro assemblers 

The IBM/360 and derivatives had powerful macro assembler facilities that were often used to generate complete assembly language programs  or sections of programs (for different operating systems for instance). Macros provided with CICS transaction processing system had assembler macros that generated COBOL statements as a pre-processing step.

Other assemblers, such as MASM, also support macros.

Metaclasses 

Metaclasses are provided by the following programming languages:
 Common Lisp
 Python
 Nil
 Groovy
 Ruby
 Smalltalk
 Lua

Template metaprogramming 

 C "X Macros"
 C++ Templates
 D
 Common Lisp, Scheme and most Lisp dialects by using the quasiquote ("backquote") operator.
 Nim

Staged metaprogramming 

 MetaML
 MetaOCaml
 Scala natively or using the Lightweight Modular Staging Framework
 Terra

Dependent types 

Usage of dependent types allows proving that generated code is never invalid. However, this approach is bleeding-edge and is rarely found outside of research programming languages.

Implementations 

The list of notable metaprogramming systems is maintained at List of Program Transformation Systems.

See also

Aspect weaver
Comparison of code generation tools
Compile-time function execution
Compile-time reflection
Genetic programming
Homoiconicity
Inferential programming
Instruction set simulator
Intentional Programming
Interpreted language
Machine learning
Metacompiler
Metaobject
Partial evaluation
Reflection (computer programming)
Self-interpreter
Self-modifying code
Source code generation
Transcompiler (also known as transpilation) 
 Very Large Scale Integration

References

External links
c2.com Wiki: Metaprogramming article
Meta Programming on the Program Transformation Wiki
Code generation Vs Metaprogramming
"Solenoid": The first metaprogramming framework for eXist-db

 
Programming paradigms